The Face Between is a 1922 American silent melodrama film. Directed by Bayard Veiller, the film stars Bert Lytell, Andrée Tourneur, and Sylvia Breamer. It was released on April 17, 1922.

Cast
 Bert Lytell as Tommy Carteret, Sr./Tommy Carteret, Jr.
 Andrée Tourneur as Sybil Eliot
 Sylvia Breamer as Marianna Canfield
 Hardee Kirkland as Mr. Hartwell
 Gerard Alexander as Mrs. Eliot
 Frank Brownlee as Joe Borral
 Burwell Hamrick as Jared
 Joel Day as Mr. Canfield
 De Witt Jennings as The doctor

References

External links

American silent feature films
American black-and-white films
1922 drama films
1922 films
Silent American drama films
Melodrama films
Metro Pictures films
1920s English-language films
1920s American films